Stratos may refer to:

People

As surname
Andreas Stratos (1905–1981), Greek politician and historian
Demetrio Stratos (1945–1979), Italian vocalist, multi-instrumentalist, and music researcher
Nikolaos Stratos (1872–1922), Greek politician and Prime Minister

As given name
Stratos (Greek: Στράτος) is a diminutive form of the Greek given name Eustratius:
Stratos Apostolakis (born 1964), Greek footballer
Stratos Dionysiou (1935–1990), Greek singer
Stratos Perperoglou (born 1984), Greek basketball player
Stratos Tzortzoglou (born 1965), Greek actor

Businesses and brands
 Stratos Boats, a boat manufacturer
 Stratos Global Corporation, a telecommunications company
 Triangle Stratos, a New Zealand television network
 Stratos, a chocolate bar brand by Nidar

Cities
 Stratos (Achaea), a city of ancient Achaea
 Stratos, Greece, an ancient city in Acarnania and modern municipality

Entertainment
 Stratos (film), a 2014 Greek film
 Fictional characters:
 Stratos (Masters of the Universe), from Masters of the Universe (1983)
 Stratos, the Titan of Air, from 1994 video game Ultima VIII: Pagan
 Stratos, the Wind Titan, from Disney's 1997 film Hercules
 Stratos, from 2000 video game Sacrifice
 Lockon Stratos, from 2007 anime Mobile Suit Gundam 00
 Einhart Stratos, from Magical Girl Lyrical Nanoha ViVid (2009)

Other uses
 Stratos (lake), near Stratos, Greece
 Icaro Stratos, an Italian rigid wing hang glider
 Lancia Stratos HF, a motor car
 New Stratos, a motor car by Manifattura Automobili Torino
 Red Bull Stratos, a high-altitude skydiving mission

See also
Stratus (disambiguation)